Aslı Bekiroğlu (born 16 November 1995) is a Turkish actress.

Bekiroğlu is a graduate of Bahçeşehir University with a degree in nutrition and dietetic studies. Between 2006 and 2011, she was a student at Istanbul University State Conservatory, learning harp and solfège. After a brief appearance in Beni Böyle Sev in 2013, she made her actual debut in 2015 with a role in the series Adı Mutluluk. She was cast in her first leading role in the TV series Gülümse Yeter. In 2016, she made her cinematic debut with a role in İkimizin Yerine. The next year, she appeared in a supporting role in the comedy movie Yol Arkadaşım. Between 2018 and 2019, she was a regular on the sitcom Jet Sosyete.

Filmography

Awards 
 45th Golden Butterfly Awards: Shining Star Award

References

External links 
 
 

1995 births
Living people
Actresses from Istanbul
Turkish television actresses
Turkish film actresses
Golden Butterfly Award winners
Istanbul University alumni